The Main road 43 is an east–west First class main road in Hungary, that connects Szeged (the Main road 5 change) with Nagylak (the border of Romania). Most of the traffic was taken over by the M43 motorway.

The road, as well as all other main roads in Hungary, is managed and maintained by Magyar Közút, state owned company.

See also

 Roads in Hungary

Sources

External links

 Hungarian Public Road Non-Profit Ltd. (Magyar Közút Nonprofit Zrt.)
 National Infrastructure Developer Ltd.

Main roads in Hungary
Csongrád-Csanád County